Georgios Xenitidis (born 4 September 1999) is a Greek professional footballer who plays as a midfielder for Super League club Panetolikos.

Honours
Olympiacos
Super League Greece: 2019–20

References

1999 births
Living people
Greek footballers
Greece youth international footballers
Greek expatriate footballers
Super League Greece players
Luxembourg National Division players
Super League Greece 2 players
Olympiacos F.C. players
Jeunesse Esch players
Olympiacos F.C. B players
Panetolikos F.C. players
Greek expatriate sportspeople in Luxembourg
Expatriate footballers in Luxembourg
Association football midfielders
Footballers from Xanthi